Tjaša Vozel (born 14 July 1990) is a Slovenian swimmer. She is competing for Slovenia at the 2012 Summer Olympics.

References

Slovenia at the 2012 Summer Olympics

Slovenian female swimmers
Swimmers at the 2012 Summer Olympics
Swimmers at the 2016 Summer Olympics
Olympic swimmers of Slovenia
1994 births
Living people
Swimmers at the 2010 Summer Youth Olympics
Swimmers at the 2013 Mediterranean Games
Swimmers at the 2018 Mediterranean Games
People from Trbovlje
Mediterranean Games competitors for Slovenia